Bamboozled is a 2000 American satirical dark comedy-drama film written and directed by Spike Lee about a modern televised minstrel show featuring black actors donning blackface makeup and the resulting violent fallout from the show's success. It features an ensemble cast including Damon Wayans, Jada Pinkett Smith, Savion Glover, Tommy Davidson, Michael Rapaport and Mos Def.

The film was given a limited release by New Line Cinema during the fall of 2000 and was released on DVD the following year. Critical reception was mixed, and the film was unsuccessful financially, becoming a box office bomb. Despite its initial reception, Bamboozled later achieved cult film status for its satirical look at stereotypical depictions of black people in both historical and contemporary American film and television productions.

Plot 

Pierre Delacroix (real name Peerless Dothan) is an uptight, Harvard-educated African-American man in the employment of television network CNS. At work, he endures torment from his boss Thomas Dunwitty, a tactless, boorish white man. Not only does Dunwitty use African-American Vernacular English (AAVE) and the word "nigger" repeatedly in conversations, he also proudly proclaims that he is more black than Delacroix and that he can use "nigger" since he is married to a black woman and has two mixed-race children. Dunwitty frequently rejects Delacroix's scripts for series that portray black people in positive, intelligent scenarios, dismissing them as "Cosby clones".

In an effort to escape his contract through being fired, Delacroix develops a minstrel show with the help of his personal assistant Sloane Hopkins. Mantan: The New Millennium Minstrel Show features black actors in blackface, extremely racist jokes and puns, and offensively stereotyped CGI-animated cartoons. Delacroix and Hopkins recruit two impoverished homeless street performers, Manray and Womack, to star in the show. While Womack is horrified when Delacroix tells him details about the show, Manray sees it as his big chance to become rich and famous for his tap-dancing skills.

To Delacroix's horror, not only does Dunwitty enthusiastically endorse the show, it also becomes hugely successful. As soon as it premieres, Manray and Womack become big stars, while Delacroix, contrary to his original stated intent, defends the show as satire. Delacroix quickly embraces the fame and recognition he receives while Hopkins becomes ashamed of her association with it. Meanwhile, an underground, militant rap group called the Mau Maus, led by Hopkins' older brother Julius, becomes increasingly angry at the show's content. Though they had earlier unsuccessfully auditioned for the program's live band position, the group plans to end the show using violence.

Womack quits, fed up with the show and Manray's increasing ego. Manray and Hopkins grow closer, despite Delacroix's attempts to sabotage their relationship. Delacroix confronts Hopkins, and when she lashes back at him, he fires her. She then shows him a videotaped montage she created of racist footage culled from assorted media to shame Delacroix into stopping production of the show, but he refuses to watch it. After an argument with Delacroix, Manray realizes he is being exploited and defiantly announces that he will no longer wear blackface. He appears in front of the studio audience, who are all in blackface, and does his dance number in his regular clothing. The network executives immediately turn against Manray, and Dunwitty fires him.

The Mau Maus kidnap Manray and announce his public execution via live webcast. The authorities work feverishly to track down the source of the internet feed, but Manray is nevertheless assassinated while doing his famous tap dancing. At his office, Delacroix (now in blackface himself, mourning Manray's death) fantasizes that the various black-themed antique collectibles in his office are staring him down and coming to life; in a rage, he destroys many of the items. The police kill all the members of the Mau Maus except for One-Sixteenth Blak, a white member who demands to die with the others.

Furious, Hopkins confronts Delacroix at gunpoint and demands that he play her tape. As he does so, Hopkins reminds him of the lives that were ruined because of his actions. During a struggle over the gun, Delacroix is shot in the stomach. Hopkins flees while proclaiming that it was Delacroix's own fault that he got shot. Delacroix, holding the gun in his hands to make his wound appear self-inflicted, watches the tape as he lies dying on the floor. The film concludes with a full reveal of the tape's contents; a long montage of racially insensitive and demeaning clips of African-American characters from Hollywood films of the first half of the 20th century. Afterwards, Manray is shown doing his last Mantan sequence on stage.

Cast

Production 
Most of the film was shot on Mini DV digital video, using the Sony VX 1000 camera, and later converted to film format. This kept the budget limited to $10 million and allowed the use of multiple cameras to simultaneously capture masters, two-shots and close-ups to save time. The Mantan: New Millenium Minstrel Show sequences, and their sponsor ads, were shot on Super 16 film stock.

Soundtrack 
The soundtrack album for the film was released September 26, 2000 by Motown Records. The album consisted of hip hop and contemporary R&B, and was India.Arie's first time on an album, with six singles.

Bamboozled is the soundtrack to Spike Lee's 2000 film Bamboozled. Composed of hip hop and contemporary R&B music, the soundtrack peaked at 60 on the Top R&B/Hip-Hop Albums. Six tracks on the album were performed by future Grammy award winner India.Arie in what were her first official appearances on an album.

Track listing

Reception

Critical response 
On Rotten Tomatoes, the film has an approval rating of 53% based on reviews from 106 critics. The site's consensus is: "Bamboozled is too over the top in its satire and comes across as more messy and overwrought than biting." On Metacritic it has a score of 54% based on reviews from 39 critics, indicating "mixed or average reviews".

Among those who gave positive reviews to the film were CNN correspondent Dennis Michael, who compared the film favorably to Mel Brooks' The Producers and praised Glover's performance in the lead role, Kenneth Turan of the Los Angeles Times, who described the film as "savage, abrasive, audacious and confrontational" and "the work of a master provocateur", and Stephen Holden of The New York Times, who described the film as "an almost oxymoronic entity, an important Hollywood movie." It was not reviewed as favorably by the Chicago Sun-Times''' Roger Ebert, who gave the film 2 stars out of a possible 4, writing that the film was "perplexing," raising important issues but handling them poorly. "The film is a satirical attack on the way TV uses and misuses African-American images, but many viewers will leave the theater thinking Lee has misused them himself."

By the time of its twentieth anniversary, Bamboozled had been reappraised as an underappreciated work of Lee's. Writing for Rolling Stone, David Fear noted that "the really scary thing is that, 20 years on, Bamboozled feels incredibly contemporary. It doesn’t look so extreme after all...and when you consider the content of this film, that’s a very troubling thing.”

 Box office 
The film grossed $2,463,650 at the box office on a $10 million budget.

 Home media Bamboozled was released on VHS and DVD by New Line Home Entertainment on April 17, 2001. The DVD edition includes a director's commentary from Spike Lee in addition to behind-the-scenes featurettes and deleted scenes.Bamboozled was added to The Criterion Collection in 2020, with a reissue on DVD and debut on Blu-ray occurring on March 17 of that year.

 See also 
 Network (1976 film), black comedy about a controversial television show with a similar structure, referenced by "Mantan" in pilot

 References 

 External links 

 
 Bamboozled at the'' TCM Movie Database
 
 
 Bamboozled: New Millennium, Same Bullshit an essay by Ashley Clark at the Criterion Collection

2000s American films
2000 comedy-drama films
2000s English-language films
2000 films
2000s hip hop films
2000 independent films
40 Acres and a Mule Filmworks films
African-American films
American black comedy films
American comedy-drama films
American independent films
American satirical films
Blackface minstrel shows and films
Camcorder films
Films directed by Spike Lee
Films about racism
Films about race and ethnicity
Films about television
Films scored by Terence Blanchard
Films set in New York City
Films shot in New York City
Films with screenplays by Spike Lee
Films produced by Jon Kilik